The Crowning with Thorns is a painting by the Italian painter Michelangelo Merisi da Caravaggio. Made probably in 1602/1604 or possibly around 1607, it is now located in the Kunsthistorisches Museum, Vienna.  It was bought in Rome by the Imperial ambassador, Baron Ludwig von Lebzelter in 1809, but did not arrive in Vienna until 1816.

History
According to Caravaggio's biographer Giovanni Bellori a Crowning with Thorns was made for Caravaggio's patron Vincenzo Giustiniani, and this painting can be traced convincingly to the Giustiniani collection. An attribution to Giustiniani would place it in the period before 1606, when Caravaggio fled Rome, but Peter Robb dates it to 1607, when the artist was in Naples.

The painting depicts a crown of thorns being forced onto the head of Jesus before his crucifixion, to mock his claim to authority.  The twisted body of Christ was influenced by the Belvedere Torso.  The painting was designed as a supraporte, to be hung over a doorway.

Style
Caravaggio's patron Vincenzo Giustiniani was an intellectual as well as a collector, and late in life he wrote a paper about art in which he identified twelve grades of accomplishment. In the highest class he named just two artists, Caravaggio and Annibale Carracci, as those capable of combining realism and style in the most accomplished manner. This Crowning with Thorns illustrates what Giustiniani meant: the cruelty of the two torturers hammering home the thorns is depicted as acutely observed reality, as is the bored slouch of the official leaning on the rail as he oversees the death of God; meanwhile Christ is suffering real pain with patient endurance; all depicted within a classical composition of contrasting and intersecting horizontals and diagonals.

The theme of pain and sadism is central to the work. John Gash points to the way the two torturers ram the crown down with the butts of their staffs, "a rhythmic and sadistic hammering."  Robb mentions that the painting is about "how ... to give pain and feel pain, and how close pain and pleasure sometimes were, how voluptuous suffering could be on a golden afternoon."

See also
 The Crowning with Thorns, c.1604 painting of the same subject, attributed to Caravaggio
List of paintings by Caravaggio

References

Further reading

External links

1600s paintings
Paintings by Caravaggio
Paintings in the collection of the Kunsthistorisches Museum
Caravaggio